Lepidodactylus intermedius is a species of gecko. It is found in Komodo and Rintja islands in the Lesser Sunda Islands.

References

Lepidodactylus
Reptiles described in 1964
Taxa named by Ilya Darevsky